Florian Habicht is a New Zealand film director.  Florian was born in Berlin, Germany and moved with his family to the Bay of Islands, New Zealand, when he was eight. He went to high school in Kerikeri before attending the University of Auckland's Elam School of Fine Arts.

There he began to make films using his classmates as actors and collaborators. The first of these to gain recognition was Liebestraume (2000), about eccentric musician Killer Ray.

In 2003 he made the digital feature Woodenhead, a surreal musical fairytale for which the entire soundtrack was recorded first and then the visuals were shot to match (and not match.)  Woodenhead was nominated in the Best Digital Feature section of the New Zealand Film and TV Awards and the film screened at a range of international festivals as well as being distributed in the US by Olive Films.

His next film Kaikohe Demolition (2004) was a portrayal of Kaikohe's demolition derby, the film won Best Digital Feature at the New Zealand Screen Awards.

In 2003 Habicht attended the Binger Institute Filmlab in Amsterdam to develop his feature script Permissive Paradise.

In 2008, he completed Rubbings from a Live Man, a documentary performed by its subject, theatre practitioner and artist Warwick Broadhead. The film was produced by Philippa Campbell (Top of the Lake, Rain)

In 2009 Habicht was the recipient of the inaugural Harriet Friedlander New York Artist Residency.  During his stay in New York City he filmed and performed in Love Story, which premiered at the opening night of the New Zealand International Film Festival in 2011. Love Story won Best Film, Best Director and Best editor at the New Zealand Film Awards that year.
The film toured international festivals and in 2012 won the Audience Choice Award at the Pluk de Nacht Outdoor Film Festival in Amsterdam.

Jarvis Cocker saw Love Story at the London International Film Festival and his British Pop group Pulp have since collaborated with Habicht and UK producer Alex Boden (Cloud Atlas) on a feature documentary about Pulp and their home town Sheffield. The film was released in 2014.

Habicht's father is the acclaimed '60s photographer Frank Habicht, whose work, produced mostly in London and Berlin, has recently regained critical and popular interest.

References

Filmography (director)

Liebestraume (2000)
Woodenhead (2003)
Kaikohe Demolition (2004)
Rubbings from a Live Man (2008)
Land of the Long White Cloud (2009)
Love Story (2011)
Pulp: A Film About Life, Death, And Supermarkets (2014)
Spookers (2017)
''James & Isey (2021)

External links
  - NZ Herald -  Britpop band Pulp documentary/concert film
  - Florian Habicht Official website
 Florian's NZ On Screen profile
  - Full length program to view - Documentary Kaikohe Demolition
  Florian Habicht Arts Foundation of New Zealand page
  - Love Story Facebook page

Elam Art School alumni
Living people
New Zealand film directors
German emigrants to New Zealand
Year of birth missing (living people)
Film directors from Berlin